Santiago San Román (born 21 September 1991) is a Mexican former professional footballer, who played for Atlas of Liga MX. He is currently the Director of Football for Toluca F.C. of Liga MX.

References

1991 births
Liga MX players
Living people
Mexican footballers
Association football midfielders
Alebrijes de Oaxaca players